Stefan Ustorf (born January 3, 1974) is a German ice hockey executive and a former professional ice hockey player who spent some time with the Washington Capitals in the National Hockey League and played predominantly in the Deutsche Eishockey Liga (DEL). He competed in four Olympic Games.

In March 2016, Ustorf was inducted into the German ice hockey Hall of Fame.

Playing career
Ustorf came through the youth ranks of ESV Kaufbeuren and made his debut in the German top-tier during the 1991-92 season.

He played briefly in the National Hockey League (NHL) with the Washington Capitals following his selection in the 1992 NHL Entry Draft. He made a total of 59 NHL appearances. After a few years in the minors, with stints in the AHL and IHL, he returned to play hockey in Germany.

Ustorf played for DEL teams Adler Mannheim, Krefeld Pinguine and then spent eight years with Eisbären Berlin, winning six German championships.

During the 2011–12 season, his 21st professional season and second year as captain of Eisbären Berlin, he suffered a season ending concussion after 23 games. Whilst still suffering from post-concussion symptoms 14 months later, and other non-related injuries, Ustorf announced his retirement at the tail end of the 2012–13 season on March 7, 2013. On December 28, 2016, he had his jersey number 14 retired by the Eisbären side.

National team
Ustorf played 128 games for the German national team, competed in four Olympic Games (1994, 1998, 2002, 2006), six World Championships and the 1996 World Cup of Hockey.

Managing career
On May 10, 2014, he was named Director of Sport at Eisbären Berlin and moved to Head of Player Development in May 2017. He parted ways with the Eisbären organization in December 2019. Prior to that, the club had told him not to renew his contract at the conclusion of the 2019-20 season. In March 2021, he was named Sporting Director of the Nürnberg Ice Tigers.

Career statistics

Regular season and playoffs

International

References

External links

1974 births
Living people
Adler Mannheim players
Cincinnati Cyclones (IHL) players
Detroit Vipers players
Eisbären Berlin players
German ice hockey left wingers
Ice hockey players at the 1994 Winter Olympics
Ice hockey players at the 1998 Winter Olympics
Ice hockey players at the 2002 Winter Olympics
Ice hockey players at the 2006 Winter Olympics
Krefeld Pinguine players
Las Vegas Thunder players
Los Angeles Kings scouts
Olympic ice hockey players of Germany
People from Kaufbeuren
Sportspeople from Swabia (Bavaria)
Portland Pirates players
Washington Capitals draft picks
Washington Capitals players